Twin Township, Ohio may refer to:
Twin Township, Darke County, Ohio
Twin Township, Preble County, Ohio
Twin Township, Ross County, Ohio

See also
Twin Township (disambiguation)
Twinsburg Township, Summit County, Ohio

Ohio township disambiguation pages